Ankaramena is a rural municipality in Madagascar. It belongs to the district of Taolanaro, which is a part of Anosy Region. The population of the commune was estimated to be 14,456  in 2019.

Only primary schooling is available. The majority 67% of the population of the commune are farmers, while an additional 13% receives their livelihood from raising livestock. The most important crops are sweet potatoes and rice, while other important agricultural products are beans and cassava. Industry and services provide employment for 2% and 10% of the population, respectively. Additionally fishing employs 8% of the population.

References

Populated places in Anosy